Jyotirmayee Dash is a professor at Indian Association for the Cultivation of Science, Kolkata, with research interests in topics related to organic chemistry and chemical biology in general.

Jyotirmayee Dash obtained PhD in synthetic organic chemistry from IIT Kanpur in 2003 under the advisorship of Prof. F. A. Khan and MSc degree from Ravenshaw University, Cuttack, India. She was Alexander von Humboldt Fellow at Freie Universität Berlin, Germany, during 2004–2006, postdoctoral fellow at ESPCI Paris, France, during 2006–2007 and Marie-Curie  Fellow at University of Cambridge, UK, during 2007–2009. She spent three years as an assistant professor at Indian Institute of Science Education and Research, Kolkata before joining Indian Association for the Cultivation of Science in 2014.

Honours and awards
The honours and awards conferred on Jyotirmayee Dash include:

Editorial Advisory Board Member, ACS Omega, 2021
International Advisory Board, Asian JOC, 2021
Shanti Swarup Bhatnagar Prize for Science and Technology for Chemical Sciences, 2020
Fellow of the Royal Society of Chemistry, FRSC, 2020
CRSI Bronze Medal, 2020
DBT/Wellcome Trust Indian Alliance Senior Fellowship, 2020
SwarnaJayanti Fellowship for the year 2015-2016

References

External links

ORCID

Recipients of the Shanti Swarup Bhatnagar Award in Chemical Science
Indian scientific authors
Living people
Indian chemists
Year of birth missing (living people)
Women scientists from West Bengal